Parliamentary elections were held in South Ossetia on 8 June 2014. The result was a victory for the United Ossetia party, which won 20 of the 34 seats in the Parliament.

Results

References

External links
South Ossetian electoral commission

Elections in South Ossetia
South Ossetia
South Ossetia
President